Sarell Everett Gleason (March 14, 1905 Brooklyn - November 20, 1974 Washington, D.C.) was an American historian and intelligence analyst.

Life
He grew up in Evanston, Illinois.  He graduated from Harvard University, in 1927, magna cum laude, and with a Ph.D. in 1934.  He taught at Harvard University, from 1931 to 1938.
On June 19, 1937, he married Mary Eleanor Abbott.

From 1942 to 1946, he was Intelligence Chief for the Office of Strategic Services. He was Deputy Executive Secretary of the National Security Council, and on the Solarium Committee.  He wrote, with William Langer, The Challenge to Isolation, for the Council of Foreign Relations.  
He was a member of the Historical Division of the Department of State, from 1962 to 1970.

His papers are held at the Harry S. Truman Library.

Awards
 1954 Bancroft Prize

Works
 The Challenge to Isolation, 1937-1940 (1952) with William L. Langer
 The Undeclared War, 1940-1941 Harper & Brothers Publishers, 1953. with William L. Langer  (reprint P. Smith, 1968)
 Foreign relations of the United States 1946, Department of State. Bureau of Public Affairs, U.S. Government Printing Office, 1972

References

External links
The Undeclared War, 1940-1941 

People from Brooklyn
Harvard University alumni
Harvard University faculty
United States Army personnel of World War II
People of the Office of Strategic Services
United States National Security Council staffers
1905 births
1974 deaths
20th-century American historians
American male non-fiction writers
Historians from New York (state)
Bancroft Prize winners
20th-century American male writers